Matthew Murray (25 December 1929 – 28 April 2016) was a Scottish football outside forward who played in the Scottish League for Kilmarnock, Queen's Park, Ayr United, Morton and St Mirren. He was capped by Scotland Amateurs and Great Britain. Murray also played in the Football League for Barrow and Carlisle United.

References 

1929 births
2016 deaths
Association football wingers
Footballers from Paisley, Renfrewshire
Scottish footballers
Queen's Park F.C. players
Kilmarnock F.C. players
Ayr United F.C. players
St Mirren F.C. players
Barrow A.F.C. players
Carlisle United F.C. players
Greenock Morton F.C. players
Scottish Football League players
English Football League players
Scotland amateur international footballers
Camelon Juniors F.C. players